Delphinium halteratum is a species of plants in the family Ranunculaceae.

Sources

References 

halteratum
Flora of Malta